Stanley Chatham Hindman (March 1, 1944 – July 15, 2020) was a professional American football defensive lineman in the National Football League (NFL) for seven seasons for the San Francisco 49ers.  

Stan Hindman went on to study architecture at UCLA and graduated with a professional M.Arch. degree in 1981. He died on July 15, 2020.

References

External links

1944 births
2020 deaths
People from Houlton, Maine
Players of American football from Maine
American football defensive tackles
American football defensive ends
Ole Miss Rebels football players
San Francisco 49ers players
American architects